Chamaeclitandra is a genus of flowering plants in the family Apocynaceae, first described as a genus in 1953. It contains only one known species, Chamaeclitandra henriquesiana, native to tropical Africa.

References

Flora of Africa
Monotypic Apocynaceae genera
Rauvolfioideae